Wing commander is a senior commissioned rank in the British Royal Air Force and air forces of many countries which have historical British influence.

Wing Commander may also refer to:

Wing Commander (franchise), the Origin Systems computer game series and related franchise
Wing Commander (video game), the first title in the Wing Commander computer game series
Wing Commander (novel series), set in the game universe
Wing Commander (film), a 1999 film based on the computer game
 Wing Commander, a 1984 flight simulator game published by Mastertronic, not related to the Wing Commander franchise
Wing Commander (horse), a six-time World Grand Champion show horse